Ixodes is a genus of hard-bodied ticks (family Ixodidae). It includes important disease vectors of animals and humans (tick-borne disease), and some species (notably Ixodes holocyclus) inject toxins that can cause paralysis. Some ticks in this genus may transmit the pathogenic bacterium Borrelia burgdorferi responsible for causing Lyme disease. Additional organisms that may be transmitted by Ixodes are parasites from the genus Babesia, which cause babesiosis, and bacteria from the related genus Anaplasma, which cause anaplasmosis.

Species
These species are recognised within the genus Ixodes:

Ixodes abrocomae Lahille, 1917
Ixodes acer Apanaskevich & Schenk, 2020
Ixodes acuminatus Neumann, 1901
Ixodes acutitarsus (Karsch, 1880)
Ixodes affinis Neumann, 1899
Ixodes albignaci Uilenberg & Hoogstraal, 1969
Ixodes alluaudi Neumann, 1913
Ixodes amarali Fonseca, 1935
Ixodes amersoni Kohls, 1966
Ixodes anatis Chilton, 1904
Ixodes andinus Kohls, 1956
Ixodes angustus Neumann, 1899
Ixodes antechini Roberts, 1960
Ixodes apronophorus Schulze, 1924
Ixodes arabukiensis Arthur, 1959
Ixodes aragaoi Fonseca, 1935
Ixodes arboricola Schulze & Schlottke, 1930
Ixodes arebiensis Arthur, 1956
Ixodes asanumai Kitaoka, 1973
Ixodes aulacodi Arthur, 1956
Ixodes auriculaelongae Arthur, 1958
Ixodes auritulus Neumann, 1904
Ixodes australiensis Neumann, 1904
Ixodes baergi Cooley & Kohls, 1942
Ixodes bakeri Arthur & Clifford, 1961
Ixodes banksi Bishopp, 1911
Ixodes barkeri Barker, 2019
Ixodes bedfordi Arthur, 1959
Ixodes bequaerti Cooley & Kohls, 1945
Ixodes berlesei Birula, 1895
Ixodes bivari Santos Dias, 1990
Ixodes boliviensis Neumann, 1904
Ixodes brewsterae Keirans, Clifford & Walker, 1982
Ixodes browningi Arthur, 1956
Ixodes brumpti Morel, 1965
Ixodes brunneus Koch, 1844
Ixodes calcarhebes Arthur & Zulu, 1980
Ixodes caledonicus Nuttall, 1910
Ixodes canisuga Johnston, 1849
Ixodes capromydis Cerný, 1966
Ixodes catherinei Keirans, Clifford & Walker, 1982
Ixodes cavipalpus Nuttall & Warburton, 1908
Ixodes ceylonensis Kohls, 1950
Ixodes chilensis Kohls, 1956
Ixodes colasbelcouri Arthur, 1957
Ixodes collocaliae Schulze, 1937
Ixodes columnae Takada & Fujita, 1992
Ixodes conepati Cooley & Kohls, 1943
Ixodes confusus Roberts, 1960
Ixodes cookei Packard, 1869 
Ixodes cooleyi Aragão & Fonseca, 1951
Ixodes copei Wilson, 1980
Ixodes cordifer Neumann, 1908
Ixodes cornuae Arthur, 1960
Ixodes cornuatus Roberts, 1960
Ixodes corwini Keirans, Clifford & Walker, 1982
Ixodes crenulatus Koch, 1844
Ixodes cuernavacensis Kohls & Clifford, 1966
Ixodes cumulatimpunctatus Schulze, 1943
Ixodes dampfi Cooley, 1943
Ixodes daveyi Nuttall, 1913
Ixodes dawesi Arthur, 1956
Ixodes dendrolagi Wilson, 1967
Ixodes dentatus Marx, 1899
Ixodes dicei Keirans & Ajohda, 2003
Ixodes diomedeae Arthur, 1958
Ixodes diversifossus Neumann, 1899
Ixodes djaronensis Neumann, 1907
Ixodes domerguei Uilenberg & Hoogstraal, 1965
Ixodes downsi Kohls, 1957
Ixodes drakensbergensis Clifford, Theiler & Baker, 1975
Ixodes eadsi Kohls & Clifford, 1964
Ixodes eastoni Keirans & Clifford, 1983
Ixodes eichhorni Nuttall, 1916
Ixodes eldaricus Dzhaparidze, 1950
Ixodes elongatus Bedford, 1929
Ixodes eudyptidis Maskell, 1885
Ixodes euplecti Arthur, 1958
Ixodes evansi Arthur, 1956
Ixodes fecialis Warburton & Nuttall, 1909
Ixodes festai Rondelli, 1926 
Ixodes fossulatus Neumann, 1899
Ixodes frontalis Panzer, 1798
Ixodes fuscipes Koch, 1844
Ixodes galapagoensis Clifford & Hoogstraal, 1980
Ixodes ghilarovi Filippova & Panova, 1988
Ixodes gibbosus Nuttall, 1916
Ixodes giluwensis Apanaskevich & Schenk, 2020
Ixodes goliath Apanaskevich and Lemon, 2018
Ixodes granulatus Supino, 1897
Ixodes gregsoni Lindquist, Wu & Redner, 1999
Ixodes guatemalensis Kohls, 1956
Ixodes hearlei Gregson, 1941
Ixodes heathi Kwak, Madden & Wicker, 2018
Ixodes heinrichi Arthur, 1962
Ixodes hexagonus Leach, 1815
Ixodes himalayensis Dhanda & Kulkarni, 1969
Ixodes hirsti Hassall, 1931
Ixodes holocyclus Neumann, 1899
Ixodes hoogstraali Arthur, 1955
Ixodes howelli Cooley & Kohls, 1938
Ixodes hyatti Clifford, Hoogstraal & Kohls, 1971
Ixodes hydromyidis Swan, 1931
Ixodes jacksoni Hoogstraal, 1967
Ixodes jellisoni Cooley & Kohls, 1938
Ixodes jonesae Kohls, Sonenshine & Clifford, 1969
Ixodes kaiseri Arthur, 1957
Ixodes kaschmiricus Pomerantsev, 1948
Ixodes kazakstani Olenev & Sorokoumov, 1934
Ixodes kerguelenensis André & Colas-Belcour, 1942
Ixodes kingi Bishopp, 1911
Ixodes kohlsi Arthur, 1955
Ixodes kopsteini Oudemans, 1926
Ixodes kuntzi Hoogstraal & Kohls, 1965
Ixodes laguri Olenev, 1929
Ixodes lasallei Méndez Arocha & Ortiz, 1958
Ixodes latus Arthur, 1958
Ixodes laysanensis Wilson, 1964
Ixodes lemuris Arthur, 1958
Ixodes lewisi Arthur, 1965
Ixodes lividus Koch, 1844
Ixodes longiscutatus Boero, 1944
Ixodes loricatus Neumann, 1899
Ixodes loveridgei Arthur, 1958
Ixodes luciae Sénevet, 1940
Ixodes lunatus Neumann, 1907
Ixodes luxuriosus Schulze, 1932
Ixodes macfarlanei Keirans, Clifford & Walker, 1982
Ixodes malayensis Kohls, 1962
Ixodes marmotae Cooley & Kohls, 1938
Ixodes marxi Banks, 1908
Ixodes maslovi Emelyanova & Kozlovskaya, 1967
Ixodes matopi Spickett, Keirans, Norval & Clifford, 1981
Ixodes mexicanus Cooley & Kohls, 1942
Ixodes microgalei Apanaskevich, Soarimalala & Goodman, 2013
Ixodes minor Neumann, 1902
Ixodes minutae Arthur, 1959
Ixodes mirzai Apanaskevich & Schenk, 2020
Ixodes mitchelli Kohls, Clifford & Hoogstraal, 1970
Ixodes monospinosus Saito, 1968
Ixodes montoyanus Cooley, 1944
Ixodes moreli Arthur, 1957
Ixodes moscharius Teng, 1982
Ixodes moschiferi Nemenz, 1968
Ixodes muniensis Arthur & Burrow, 1957
Ixodes muris Bishopp & Smith, 1937
Ixodes murreleti Cooley & Kohls, 1945
Ixodes myospalacis Teng, 1986
Ixodes myotomys Clifford & Hoogstraal, 1970
Ixodes myrmecobii Roberts, 1962
Ixodes nairobiensis Nuttall, 1916
Ixodes nchisiensis Arthur, 1958
Ixodes nectomys Kohls, 1956
Ixodes neitzi Clifford, Walker & Keirans, 1977
Ixodes nesomys Uilenberg & Hoogstraal, 1969
Ixodes neuquenensis Ringuelet, 1947
Ixodes nicolasi Santos Dias, 1982
Ixodes nipponensis Kitaoka & Saito, 1967
Ixodes nitens Neumann, 1904
Ixodes nuttalli Lahille, 1913
Ixodes nuttallianus Schulze, 1930
Ixodes occultus Pomerantsev, 1946
Ixodes ochotonae Gregson, 1941
Ixodes okapiae Arthur, 1956
Ixodes oldi Nuttall, 1913
Ixodes ornithorhynchi Lucas, 1846
Ixodes ovatus Neumann, 1899
Ixodes pacificus Cooley & Kohls, 1943
Ixodes paranaensis Barros-Battesti, Arzua, Pichorim & Keirans, 2003
Ixodes pararicinus Keirans & Clifford, in Keirans, Clifford, Guglielmone & Mangold, 1985
Ixodes pavlovskyi Pomerantsev, 1946
Ixodes percavatus Neumann, 1906
Ixodes peromysci Augustson, 1940
Ixodes persulcatus Schulze, 1930
Ixodes petauristae Warburton, 1933
Ixodes philipi Keirans & Kohls, 1970
Ixodes pilosus Koch, 1844
Ixodes planiscutatus Apanaskevich & Schenk, 2020
Ixodes pomerantzi Kohls, 1956
Ixodes pomeranzevi Serdyukova, 1941
Ixodes priscicollaris Schulze, 1932
Ixodes procaviae Arthur & Burrow, 1957
Ixodes prokopjevi (Emelyanova, 1979)
Ixodes radfordi Kohls, 1948
Ixodes rageaui Arthur, 1958
Ixodes randrianasoloi Uilenberg & Hoogstraal, 1969
Ixodes rangtangensis Teng, 1973
Ixodes rasus Neumann, 1899
Ixodes redikorzevi Olenev, 1927
Ixodes rhabdomysae Arthur, 1959
Ixodes ricinus (Linnaeus, 1758)
Ixodes rothschildi Nuttall & Warburton, 1911
Ixodes rotundatus Arthur, 1958
Ixodes rubicundus Neumann, 1904
Ixodes rubidus Neumann, 1901
Ixodes rugicollis Schulze & Schlottke, 1930
Ixodes rugosus Bishopp, 1911
Ixodes sachalinensis Filippova, 1971
Ixodes scapularis Say, 1821
Ixodes schillingsi Neumann, 1901
Ixodes schulzei Aragão & Fonseca, 1951
Ixodes sculptus Neumann, 1904
Ixodes semenovi Olenev, 1929
Ixodes serrafreirei Amorim, Gazeta, Bossi & Linhares, 2003
Ixodes shahi Clifford, Hoogstraal & Kohls, 1971
Ixodes siamensis Kitaoka & Suzuki, 1983
Ixodes sigelos Keirans, Clifford & Corwin, 1976
Ixodes signatus Birula, 1895
Ixodes simplex Neumann, 1906
Ixodes sinaloa Kohls & Clifford, 1966
Ixodes sinensis Teng, 1977
Ixodes soarimalalae Apanaskevich & Goodman, 2020
Ixodes soricis Gregson, 1942
Ixodes spinae Arthur, 1958
Ixodes spinicoxalis Neumann, 1899
Ixodes spinipalpis Hadwen & Nuttall, 1916
Ixodes steini Schulze, 1932
Ixodes stellae Apanaskevich & Schenk, 2020
Ixodes stilesi Neumann, 1911
Ixodes stromi Filippova, 1957
Ixodes subterranus Filippova, 1961
Ixodes succineus Weidner, 1964
Ixodes taglei Kohls, 1969
Ixodes tamaulipas Kohls & Clifford, 1966
Ixodes tancitarius Cooley & Kohls, 1942
Ixodes tanuki Saito, 1964
Ixodes tapirus Kohls, 1956
Ixodes tasmani Neumann, 1899
Ixodes tecpanensis Kohls, 1956
Ixodes tertiarius Scudder
Ixodes texanus Banks, 1909
Ixodes theilerae Arthur, 1953
Ixodes thomasae Arthur & Burrow, 1957
Ixodes tiptoni Kohls & Clifford, 1962
Ixodes tovari Cooley, 1945
Ixodes transvaalensis Clifford & Hoogstraal, 1966
Ixodes trianguliceps Birula, 1895
Ixodes trichosuri Roberts, 1960
Ixodes tropicalis Kohls, 1956
Ixodes turdus Nakatsuji, 1942
Ixodes ugandanus Neumann, 1906
Ixodes uilenbergi Apanaskevich & Goodman, 2020
Ixodes uncus Apanaskevich & Goodman, 2020
Ixodes unicavatus Neumann, 1908
Ixodes uriae White, 1852
Ixodes vanidicus Schulze, 1943
Ixodes venezuelensis Kohls, 1953
Ixodes ventalloi Gil Collado, 1936
Ixodes vespertilionis Koch, 1844
Ixodes vestitus Neumann, 1908
Ixodes victoriensis Nuttall, 1916
Ixodes walkerae Clifford, Kohls & Hoogstraal, 1968
Ixodes werneri Kohls, 1950
Ixodes woodi Bishopp, 1911
Ixodes zaglossi Kohls, 1960
Ixodes zairensis Keirans, Clifford & Walker, 1982
Ixodes zumpti Arthur, 1960

References

External links

 
Ixodidae
Acari genera
Taxa named by Pierre André Latreille